Matías Carlos Schulz (born 12 February 1982) is an Argentine handball goalkeeper for Pfadi Winterthur and the Argentina men's national handball team.

He defended Argentina at the 2012 London Summer Olympics, and at the 2016 Rio de Janeiro Summer Olympics.

Individual achiviements
Top Goal Keeper:
2015 Pan American Games
2016 Pan American Men's Handball Championship
2019 Pan American Games

References

External links

1982 births
Living people
Argentine people of German descent
Argentine male handball players
Olympic handball players of Argentina
Handball players at the 2012 Summer Olympics
Handball players at the 2016 Summer Olympics
Handball players at the 2007 Pan American Games
Handball players at the 2011 Pan American Games
Handball players at the 2015 Pan American Games
Handball players at the 2019 Pan American Games
Pan American Games medalists in handball
Pan American Games gold medalists for Argentina
Pan American Games silver medalists for Argentina
Sportspeople from Buenos Aires
Liga ASOBAL players
Expatriate handball players
Argentine expatriate sportspeople in France
Argentine expatriate sportspeople in Spain
Argentine expatriate sportspeople in Switzerland
BM Granollers players
South American Games silver medalists for Argentina
South American Games medalists in handball
Competitors at the 2018 South American Games
Medalists at the 2007 Pan American Games
Medalists at the 2015 Pan American Games
Medalists at the 2019 Pan American Games
Medalists at the 2011 Pan American Games
21st-century Argentine people